Ladislav Čepčianský (2 February 1931 – 2 October 2021) was a Czechoslovak sprint canoeist who competed from the late 1950s to the early 1960s. He won a silver medal in the K-1 10000 m event at the 1958 ICF Canoe Sprint World Championships in Prague. Čepčianský also competed in two Summer Olympics, earning his best finish of sixth at Melbourne in 1956 both in the K-1 1000 m and the K-1 10000 m events.

References

Ladislav Čepčianský's profile at Sports Reference.com
Ladislav Čepčianský's obituary 

1931 births
2021 deaths
Canoeists at the 1956 Summer Olympics
Canoeists at the 1960 Summer Olympics
Czechoslovak male canoeists
Olympic canoeists of Czechoslovakia
ICF Canoe Sprint World Championships medalists in kayak